Lawrence Hyde may refer to:

 Lawrence Hyde (died 1590), MP for Malmesbury, Heytesbury and Chippenham
 Lawrence Hyde (attorney-general) (1562–1641), attorney-general to Anne of Denmark, James I's consort
 Lawrence Hyde (MP for Hindon) (c. 1595–1643), English lawyer and politician
 Lawrence Hyde (MP for Winchester) (c. 1610–1682), Member of Parliament for Winchester, 1661–1679

See also 
 Laurence Hyde (disambiguation)
 Laurance M. Hyde (1892–1978), American jurist, chief justice of the Missouri Supreme Court